Hawkesbury Upton is a village in South Gloucestershire, England, east of the much smaller Hawkesbury. It lies north of Horton, east of Dunkirk and south of Alderley and Hillesley.

Hawkesbury Upton is close to the A46 road. The village lies on the Cotswold Way and exhibits many of the characteristics of a Cotswold village, including use of the local limestone in the majority of the buildings.

The village has two pubs – the Beaufort Arms and the Fox Inn, both on the High Street – a primary school, a village shop, a post office and a hair salon. There is a village hall with a recreation ground and a cricket club.

On the last Saturday in August, the annual Hawkesbury Horticultural Show takes place at the village hall and recreation ground. The show features a large marquee, where fruit, vegetables and flowers, as well as home baking, varied crafts, home made wine and beer, original photographs and pictures are exhibited – all produced by the community. There is entertainment in the arena, a carnival procession, fairground rides and local craft, trade and charity stalls. The show has run continuously since 1885 - never once cancelled for adverse weather or war - something which villagers are extremely proud of, although the 2020 show was postponed due to the COVID-19 pandemic in the United Kingdom.

Somerset Monument 

The Somerset Monument stands on the Cotswold Edge escarpment, about half a mile from the village on the road towards Hillesley. Built in ashlar and designed by Lewis Vulliamy, it was constructed in 1846 as a memorial to Lord Edward Somerset, who led the British cavalry at the Battle of Waterloo.

The first keeper of the monument was Shadrack Byfield, a one-armed veteran of the Anglo-American War of 1812. Byfield, a native of Bradford on Avon in Wiltshire, lived in Hawkesbury Upton from 1843 to 1856.

Hawkesbury Stallions Football Club
The village was also home to a football club, the Hawkesbury Stallions. The club was founded by villagers Simon Warren and Ollie Gillman in 2009, after the previous iteration of the side collapsed some years earlier. The club were due to play in Stroud and District League Division 6 when they folded in 2014.

2009–10 season

The Stallions spent their first two seasons in the basement of the English football league system, Stroud and District League Division 8. With a team of mostly 16 and 17-year-olds, guided by centre half Clive Warren, the Stallions let in 80 goals including a 13-1 defeat to Avonvale United 3rds in their second competitive match, away to Tetbury. Sixteen supporters were in attendance for the Stallions' first league game, a 5-6 home defeat to Stroud Imperial Reserves a week earlier at The Rec. The Stallions finished 10th out of 12 that season, not helped by a controversial docking of points for failing to field a side against Sharpness 3rds on Easter Monday, when many players refused to play for religious reasons.

2010–11 season
Another 10th place finish in the league followed for the Stallions in their second season, with the club going through a transition period as many of their original players left the village for university and work.

2011–12 season
The Stallions achieved promotion to Division 7 after finishing second in Division 8, narrowly missing out on the title after finishing one point behind Trident. The season also saw the Stallions achieve their biggest win in their five-year history: a 19-0 away win over Alkerton Rangers Reserves, who finished the season with -1 points.

2012–13 season
The 2012-13 season was a story of revenge, with the Stallions hammering Avonvale United 3rds 13-1 in an exact reversal of their second ever competitive game three years earlier. Other notable results include beating local rivals Wickwar Wanderers Reserves 4-0 away and drawing 2-2 with them at home. The Stallions finished 5th out of 11 in their first year in Division 7.

2013–14 season
The Stallions lifted their only piece of silverware in the 2013–14 season as they convincingly won Division 7, finishing nine points clear of their nearest rivals, Rodborough Old Boys. The Stallions only suffered one defeat all season, a 2-1 away loss to Charfield Reserves when the title had already been secured. Season highlights included two more victories over rivals Wickwar Wanderers Reserves. as well as a 16-0 drubbing of Randwick 3rds. The club achieved promotion to Division 6, but folded before the start of the next season.

Hawkesbury Upton Literature Festival
The Hawkesbury Upton Literature Festival was founded by local author Debbie Young and has been held annually since 2015.

References

External links

 Hawkesbury Parish Council
 Village website
 Hawkesbury Show website

Villages in South Gloucestershire District